= Francis Amyot =

Irish linguist and academic

Francis Amyot, M.D. was Professor of French and German at Trinity College, Dublin in the late 18th century. His wife was Mary Stokes. Their daughter, Mary, was born in 1771.
